Indianford (also Fosters Ferry, Fulton Center, Indian Ford, or Morses Landing) is an unincorporated community located in the town of Fulton, in Rock County, Wisconsin, United States, on the Rock River. The Rock River is dammed at Indianford.

Notes

Unincorporated communities in Wisconsin
Unincorporated communities in Rock County, Wisconsin